Apocampta is a genus of flies in the family Tabanidae.

Species
Apocampta subcana (Walker, 1848)

References

Tabanidae
Brachycera genera
Diptera of Australasia
Taxa named by Ignaz Rudolph Schiner